In mathematics, the normal form of a dynamical system is a simplified form that can be useful in determining the system's behavior.

Normal forms are often used for determining local bifurcations in a system. All systems exhibiting a certain type of bifurcation are locally (around the equilibrium) topologically equivalent to the normal form of the bifurcation. For example, the normal form of a saddle-node bifurcation is 

where  is the bifurcation parameter. The transcritical bifurcation 

near  can be converted to the normal form 

with the transformation .

See also canonical form for use of the terms canonical form, normal form, or standard form more generally in mathematics.

References

Further reading 
 
 
 
 

Bifurcation theory
Dynamical systems